The 1936 United States presidential election in Ohio was held on November 3, 1936 as part of the 1936 United States presidential election. State voters chose 26 electors to the Electoral College, who voted for president and vice president.

Ohio was decisively won by Democratic Party candidate, incumbent President Franklin D. Roosevelt, with 57.99% of the popular vote. The Republican Party candidate, Alf Landon, garnered a meager 37.44% of the popular vote. , this is the last election in which Allen County and Hancock County voted for a Democratic presidential candidate.

Results

Results by county

See also
 United States presidential elections in Ohio

Notes

References

Ohio
1936
1936 Ohio elections